A blackboard is a reusable writing surface.

Blackboard may also refer to:

 Black board (Soviet policy), sign used in the Soviet era publicly to chastise farms or factories for such things as failing to meet targets or opposing collectivisation
 Blackboard bold, a style of typeface often used for certain symbols in mathematics and physics texts
 Blackboard Inc., an e-learning software company
 Blackboard Learn, a course management system by Blackboard Inc.
 Blackboard system, an artificial intelligence approach to problem-solving, either a specific architecture or an application
 Blackboard (design pattern), in software engineering
 Blackboards (2000), an Iranian film

See also 
 
 
 Chalkboard (disambiguation)
 Blackbaud, a software company supplying nonprofit organizations